The 2021 Los Angeles Angels season was the 61st season of the Angels franchise in the American League, the 56th in Anaheim, and their 56th season playing their home games at Angel Stadium. The Angels were managed by Joe Maddon in his second season as manager of the Angels. They play their home games at Angel Stadium as members of Major League Baseball's American League West Division. On September 21, the Angels were eliminated from the postseason. This was the seventh straight season without making the postseason (the third longest drought in team history) and the sixth in a row with a losing record (the worst span since the 1971-77 seasons).

The season was also the first for play-by-play commentators Matt Vasgersian and Daron Sutton who assumed a split role after the departure of Victor Rojas. The Angels parted ways with Sutton midway through the season.

Previous season

The Angels finished the 2020 season 26–34 to finish in 4th place in the AL West division, missing the playoffs for the sixth consecutive year.

Regular season

Season standings

American League West

Record against opponents

Opening Day Starters

2021 Regular Season Batting Stats
Note: POS = Position; G = Games played; AB = At bats; R = Runs scored; H = Hits; 2B = Doubles; 3B = Triples; HR = Home runs; RBI = Runs batted in; BB = Walks; SB = Stolen bases; AVG = Batting average; OBP = On-base percentage plus slugging; SLG = Slugging percentage; OPS = On-base percentage plus slugging

2021 Regular Season Pitching Stats
Note: W = Wins; L = Losses; ERA = Earned run average; G = Games pitched; GS = Games started; SV = Saves; IP = Innings pitched; H = Hits allowed; R = Runs allowed; ER = Earned runs allowed; BB = Walks allowed, SO = Strikeouts

Game Log

|-style="background:#bfb;"
| 1 || April 1 || White Sox || 4–3 || Mayers (1–0) || Bummer (0–1) || Iglesias (1) || 13,207 || 1–0 || W1
|- style="background:#fbb;"
| 2 || April 2 || White Sox || 8–12 || Kopech (1–0) || Heaney (0–1) || Hendriks (1) || 12,763 || 1–1 ||L1
|- style="background:#bfb;"
| 3 || April 3 || White Sox || 5–3 || Guerra (1–0) || Marshall (0–1) || — || 12,043 || 2–1 || W1
|- style="background:#bfb;"
| 4 || April 4 || White Sox || 7–4 || Iglesias (1–0) || Ruiz (0–1) || — || 12,396 || 3–1 || W2
|- style="background:#bfb;"
| 5 || April 5 || Astros || 7–6 || Watson (1–0) || Smith (0–1) || Mayers (1) || 13,447 || 4–1 || W3
|- style="background:#fbb;"
| 6 || April 6 || Astros || 2–4 || Pressly (1–0) || Iglesias (1–1) || — || 11,122 || 4–2 || L1
|- style="background:#bfb;"
| 7 || April 8 || @ Blue Jays || 7–5  || Guerra (2–0) || Borucki (1–1) || Iglesias (2) || 1,348 || 5–2 || W1
|- style="background:#bfb;"
| 8 || April 9 || @ Blue Jays || 7–1 || Heaney (1–1) || Zeuch (0–1) || — || 1,523 || 6–2 || W2
|- style="background:#fbb;"
| 9 || April 10 || @ Blue Jays || 1–15 || Matz (2–0) || Quintana (0–1) || Milone (1) || 1,292 || 6–3 || L1
|- style="background:#bbb;"
| – || April 11 || @ Blue Jays || colspan=7 | Postponed (Rain, Makeup August 10)
|- style="background:#bfb;"
| 10 || April 12 || @ Royals || 10–3 || Cobb (1–0) || Singer (0–2) || — || 6,962 || 7–3 || W1
|- style="background:#fbb;"
| 11 || April 13 || @ Royals || 2–3 || Duffy (2–0) || Bundy (0–1) || Holland (1) || 6,404 || 7–4 || L1
|- style="background:#fbb;"
| 12 || April 14 || @ Royals || 1–6 || Keller (1–1) || Canning (0–1) || — || 6,814 || 7–5 || L2
|- style="background:#bfb;"
| 13 || April 16 || Twins || 10–3 || Slegers (1–0) || Dobnak (0–3) || — || 13,428 || 8–5 || W1
|- style="background:#bbb;"
| — || April 17 || Twins || colspan=7| Postponed (COVID-19; Makeup: May 20)
|- style="background:#bbb;"
| —  || April 18 || Twins || colspan=7| Postponed (COVID-19; Makeup: May 20) 
|- style="background:#fbb;"
| 14 || April 19 || Rangers || 4–6 || Arihara (2–1) || Bundy (0–2) || Kennedy (4) || 11,396 || 8–6 || L1
|- style="background:#bfb;"
| 15 || April 20 || Rangers || 6–2 || Canning (1–1) || Lyles (1–1) || — || 12,544 || 9–6 || W1
|- style="background:#fbb;"
| 16 || April 21 || Rangers || 4–7 || King (2–0) || Mayers (1–1) || — || 9,207 || 9–7 || L1
|- style="background:#fbb;"
| 17 || April 22 || @ Astros || 2–8 || Javier (2–0) || Cobb (1–1) || — || 13,985 || 9–8 || L2
|- style="background:#fbb;"
| 18 || April 23 || @ Astros || 4–5  || Pressly (2–0) || Iglesias (1–2) || — || 21,728 || 9–9 || L3
|- style="background:#fbb;"
| 19 || April 24 || @ Astros || 2–16 || Emanuel (1–0) || Canning (1–2) || — || 21,820 || 9–10 || L4
|- style="background:#bfb;"
| 20 || April 25 || @ Astros || 4–2 || Rodriguez (1–0) || García (0–2) || Iglesias (3) || 21,781 || 10–10 || W1
|- style="background:#bfb;"
| 21 || April 26 || @ Rangers || 9–4 || Ohtani (1–0) || Lyles (1–2) || — || 17,766 || 11–10 || W2
|- style="background:#fbb;"
| 22 || April 27 || @ Rangers || 1–6 || Foltynewicz (1–3) || Quintana (0–2) || — || 16,103 || 11–11 || L1
|- style="background:#bfb;"
| 23 || April 28 || @ Rangers || 4–3 || Rodriguez (2–0) || Dunning (1–1) || Iglesias (4) || 17,875 || 12–11 || W1
|- style="background:#fbb;"
| 24 || April 30 || @ Mariners || 4–7 || Steckenrider (2–1) || Heaney (1–2) || — || 8,632 || 12–12 || L1
|-

|- style="background:#bfb;"
| 25 || May 1 || @ Mariners || 10–5 || Canning (2–2) || Newsome (1–1) || — || 8,993 || 13–12 || W1
|- style="background:#fbb;"
| 26 || May 2 || @ Mariners || 0–2 || Sheffield (2–2) || Bundy (0–3) || Montero (4) || 9,000 || 13–13 || L1
|- style="background:#fbb;"
| 27 || May 3 || Rays || 3–7 || Glasnow (4–1) || Quintana (0–3) || — || 10,641 || 13–14 || L2
|- style="background:#fbb;"
| 28 || May 4 || Rays || 3–8 || Patiño (1–0) || Cobb (1–2) || — || 8,152 || 13–15 || L3
|- style="background:#fbb;"
| 29 || May 5 || Rays || 1–3 || Yarbrough (2–3) || Guerra (2–1) || Springs (2) || 9,169 || 13–16 || L4
|- style="background:#fbb;"
| 30 || May 6 || Rays || 3–8 || Fleming (2–3) || Mayers (1–2) || — || 8,840 || 13–17 || L5
|- style="background:#bfb;"
| 31 || May 7 || Dodgers || 9–2 || Canning (3–2) || Urías (4–1) || Sandoval (1) || 15,316 || 14–17 || W1
|- style="background:#fbb;"
| 32 || May 8 || Dodgers || 11–14 || Kershaw (5–3)|| Bundy (0–4)|| Treinen (1) || 15,274 || 14–18 ||L1
|- style="background:#bfb;"
| 33 || May 9 || Dodgers || 2–1 || Slegers (2–0) || Bauer (3–2) || Iglesias (5) || 15,294 || 15–18 || W1
|- style="background:#bfb;"
| 34 || May 10 || @ Astros || 5–4 || Suárez (1–0) || Bielak (1–2) || Iglesias (6) || 13,695 || 16–18 || W2
|- style="background:#fbb;"
| 35 || May 11 || @ Astros || 1–5 || McCullers Jr. (3–1) || Slegers (2–1) || — || 17,350 || 16–19 || L1
|- style="background:#fbb;"
| 36 || May 12 || @ Astros || 1–9 || Bielak (2–2) || Heaney (1–3) || — || 13,668 || 16–20 || L2
|- style="background:#fbb;"
| 37 || May 14 || @ Red Sox || 3–4 || Andriese (2–2) || Watson (1–1) || Barnes (9) || 9,284 || 16–21 || L3
|- style="background:#fbb;"
| 38 || May 15 || @ Red Sox || 0–9 || Pérez (1–2) || Bundy (0–5) || — || 9,374 || 16–22 || L4
|- style="background:#bfb;"
| 39 || May 16 || @ Red Sox || 6–5 || Iglesias (2–2) || Barnes (1–1) || Mayers (2) || 9,316 || 17–22 || W1
|- style="background:#bfb;"
| 40 || May 17 || Indians || 7–4 || Watson (2–1) || Hentges (1–1) || Iglesias (7) || 9,527 || 18–22 || W2
|- style="background:#fbb;"
| 41 || May 18 || Indians || 5–6 || Plesac (4–3) || Claudio (0–1) || Karinchak (4) || 9,491 || 18–23 || L1
|- style="background:#fbb;"
| 42 || May 19 || Indians || 2–3 || Civale (6–1) || Watson (2–2) || Karinchak (5) || 10,378 || 18–24 || L2
|- style="background:#bfb;"
| 43 || May 20  || Twins || 7–1  || Cobb (2–2) || Thorpe (0–2) || — || 9,920 || 19–24 || W1
|- style="background:#fbb;"
| 44 || May 20  || Twins || 3–6  || Berríos (4–2) || Canning (3–3) || Robles (2) || 9,820 || 19–25 || L1
|- style="background:#fbb;"
| 45 || May 21 || Athletics || 4–8 || Petit (6–0) || Mayers (1–3) || — || 14,624 || 19–26 || L2
|- style="background:#fbb;"
| 46 || May 22 || Athletics || 2–6 || Bassitt (4–2) || Sandoval (0–1) || — || 15,151 || 19–27 || L3
|- style="background:#bfb;"
| 47 || May 23 || Athletics || 6–5 || Iglesias (3–2) || Guerra (1–1) || — || 15,154 || 20–27 || W1
|- style="background:#bfb;"
| 48 || May 25 || Rangers || 11–5 || Heaney (2–3) || Yang (0–2) || — || 10,987 || 21–27 || W2
|- style="background:#bfb;"
| 49 || May 26 || Rangers || 9–8 || Canning (4–3) || Dunning (2–4) || Iglesias (8) || 8,547 || 22–27 || W3
|- style="background:#fbb;"
| 50 || May 27 || @ Athletics || 0–5 || Bassitt (5–2) || Slegers (2–2) || — || 5,487 || 22–28 || L1
|- style="background:#fbb;"
| 51 || May 28 || @ Athletics || 1–3 || Petit (7–0) || Ohtani (1–1) || Trivino (7) || 8,757 || 22–29 || L2
|- style="background:#bfb;"
| 52 || May 29 || @ Athletics || 4–0 || Cobb (3–2) || Montas (5–5) || — || 9,433 || 23–29 || W1
|- style="background:#bfb;"
| 53 || May 30 || @ Athletics || 4–2 || Suárez (2–0) || Irvin (3–7) || Iglesias (9) || 10,029 || 24–29 || W2
|- style="background:#fbb;"
| 54 || May 31 || @ Giants || 1–6 || Cueto (4–1) || Bundy (0–6) || — || 13,144 || 24–30 || L1
|-

|- style="background:#bfb;"
| 55 || June 1 || @ Giants || 8–1 || Heaney (3–3) || Wood (5–3) || — || 10,546 || 25–30 || W1
|- style="background:#fbb;"
| 56 || June 3 || Mariners || 2–6 || Sheffield (5–4) || Canning (4–4) || — || 9,714 || 25–31 || L1
|- style="background:#bfb;"
| 57 || June 4 || Mariners || 3–2 || Ohtani (2–1) || Santiago (0–1) || Iglesias (10) || 15,141 || 26–31 || W1
|- style="background:#bfb;"
| 58 || June 5 || Mariners || 12–5 || Cobb (4–2) || Steckenrider (2–2) || — || 15,071 || 27–31 || W2
|- style="background:#fbb;"
| 59 || June 6 || Mariners || 5–9 || Gilbert (1–2) || Sandoval (0–2) || — || 12,833 || 27–32 || L1
|- style="background:#bfb;"
| 60 || June 7 || Royals || 8–3 || Bundy (1–6) || Kowar (0–1) || — || 9,481 || 28–32 || W1
|- style="background:#bfb;"
| 61 || June 8 || Royals || 8–1 || Heaney (4–3) || Bubic (1–1) || — || 9,387 || 29–32 || W2
|- style="background:#bfb;"
| 62 || June 9 || Royals || 6–1 || Canning (5–4) || Keller (6–5) || — || 10,474 || 30–32 || W3
|- style="background:#bfb;"
| 63 || June 11 || @ Diamondbacks || 6–5  || Iglesias (4–2) || Smith (1-4) || Claudio (1) || 18,458 || 31–32 || W4
|- style="background:#bfb;"
| 64 || June 12 || @ Diamondbacks || 8–7 || Claudio (1–1) || Soria (0–3) || Iglesias (11) || 13,863 || 32–32 || W5
|- style="background:#bfb;"
| 65 || June 13 || @ Diamondbacks || 10–3 || Sandoval (1–2) || Duplantier (0–3) || — || 12,768 || 33–32 || W6
|- style="background:#fbb;"
| 66 || June 14 || @ Athletics || 5–8 || Manaea (6–2) || Bundy (1–7) || Trivino (11) || 4,102 || 33–33 || L1
|- style="background:#fbb;"
| 67 || June 15 || @ Athletics || 4–6 || Montas (7–6) || Heaney (4–4) || Petit (2) || 4,942 || 33–34 || L2
|- style="background:#fbb;"
| 68 || June 16 || @ Athletics || 4–8 || Smith (1–0) || Watson (2–3) || — || 6,228 || 33–35 || L3
|- style="background:#bfb;"
| 69 || June 17 || Tigers || 7–5 || Ohtani (3–1) || Manning (0–1) || Iglesias (12) || 30,709 || 34–35 || W1
|- style="background:#bfb;"
| 70 || June 18 || Tigers || 11–3 || Cobb (5–2) || Ureña (2–7) || — || 22,734 || 35–35 || W2
|- style="background:#bfb;"
| 71 || June 19 || Tigers || 8–3 || Sandoval (2–2) || Peralta (0–1) || — || 23,175 || 36–35 || W3
|- style="background:#fbb;"
| 72 || June 20 || Tigers || 3–5  || Cisnero (1–4) || Iglesias (4–3) || Fulmer (6) || 21,626 || 36–36 || L1
|- style="background:#fbb;"
| 73 || June 22 || Giants || 0–5 || DeSclafani (8–2) || Heaney (4–5) || — || 28,354 || 36–37 || L2
|- style="background:#fbb;"
| 74 || June 23 || Giants || 3–9  || Leone (1–0) || Claudio (1–2)  || — || 20,620 || 36–38 || L3
|- style="background:#fbb;"
| 75 || June 25 || @ Rays || 3–4 || McHugh (2–1) || Suárez (2–1) || Castillo (12) || 7,909 || 36–39 || L4
|- style="background:#fbb;"
| 76 || June 26 || @ Rays || 3–13 || McClanahan (3–2) || Cobb (5–3) || — || 16,699 || 36–40 || L5
|- style="background:#bfb;"
| 77 || June 27 || @ Rays || 6–4 || Watson (3–3) || Wisler (1–3) || Iglesias (13) || 12,764 || 37–40 || W1
|- style="background:#bfb;"
| 78 || June 28 || @ Yankees || 5–3 || Suárez (3–1) || King (0–4) || Iglesias (14) || 25,540 || 38–40 || W2
|- style="background:#fbb;"
| 79 || June 29 || @ Yankees || 5–11 || Taillon (3–4) || Heaney (4–6) || — || 23,152 || 38–41 || L1
|- style="background:#bfb;"
| 80 || June 30 || @ Yankees || 11–8 || Mayers (2–3) || Luetge (2–1) || Iglesias (15) || 30,714 || 39–41 || W1
|-

|- style="background:#bbb;"
| — || July 1 || @ Yankees || colspan=7 | Postponed (Rain, Makeup August 16)
|- style="background:#bfb;"
| 81 || July 2 || Orioles || 8–7 || Iglesias (5–3) || Fry (2–3) || — || 23,561 || 40–41 || W2
|- style="background:#bfb;"
| 82 || July 3 || Orioles || 4–1 || Cobb (6–3) || López (2–11) || Iglesias (16) || 28,160 || 41–41 || W3
|- style="background:#bfb;"
| 83 || July 4 || Orioles || 6–5 || Iglesias (6–3) || Sulser (2–1) || — || 18,955 || 42–41 || W4
|- style="background:#fbb;"
| 84 || July 5 || Red Sox || 4–5 || Pérez (7–4) || Suárez (3–2) || Ottavino (7) || 38,201 || 42–42 || L1
|- style="background:#bfb;"
| 85 || July 6 || Red Sox || 5–3 || Ohtani (4–1) || Eovaldi (9–5) || Iglesias (17) || 28,689 || 43–42 || W1
|- style="background:#bfb;"
| 86 || July 7 || Red Sox || 5–4 || Heaney (5–6) || Rodríguez (6–5) || Iglesias (18) || 20,001 || 44–42 || W2
|- style="background:#fbb;"
| 87 || July 9 || @ Mariners || 3–7 || Steckenrider (3–2) || Mayers (2–4) || — || 20,381 || 44–43 || L1
|- style="background:#fbb;"
| 88 || July 10 || @ Mariners || 0–2 || Flexen (8–3) || Sandoval (2–3) || Sewald (2) || 27,353 || 44–44 || L2
|- style="background:#bfb;"
| 89 || July 11 || @ Mariners || 7–1 || Suárez (4–2) || Ramírez (0–1) || Iglesias (19) || 23,348 || 45–44 || W1
|-style=background:#bcf
| ASG || July 13 || AL @ NL || 5–2 || Ohtani (1–0) || Burnes (0–1) || Hendriks (1) || 49,814 || 45–44 || N/A
|- style="background:#fbb;"
| 90 || July 16 || Mariners || 5–6 || Flexen (9–3) || Heaney (5–7) || Sewald (3) || 40,880 || 45–45 || L1
|- style="background:#bfb;"
| 91 || July 17 || Mariners || 9–4 || Cobb (7–3) || Kikuchi (6–5) || — || 28,927 || 46–45 || W1
|- style="background:#fbb;"
| 92 || July 18 || Mariners || 4–7 || Gilbert (4–2) || Sandoval (2–4) || — || 23,434 || 46–46 || L1
|- style="background:#fbb;"
| 93 || July 19 || @ Athletics || 1–4 || Irvin (7–8) || Cishek (0–1) || Trivino (15) || 14,856 || 46–47 || L2
|- style="background:#fbb;"
| 94 || July 20 || @ Athletics || 0–6 || Kaprielian (5–3) || Suárez (4–3) || — || 9,154 || 46–48 || L3
|- style="background:#bfb;"
| 95 || July 22 || @ Twins || 3–2 || Heaney (6–7) || Maeda (4–4) || Iglesias (20) || 23,337 || 47–48 || W1
|- style="background:#fbb;"
| 96 || July 23 || @ Twins || 4–5 || Minaya (1–0) || Iglesias (6–4) || Rogers (9) || 21,384 || 47–49 || L1
|- style="background:#bfb;"
| 97 || July 24 || @ Twins || 2–1 || Sandoval (3–4) || Berríos (7–5) || Iglesias (21) || 22,240 || 48–49 || W1
|- style="background:#bfb;"
| 98 || July 25 || @ Twins || 6–2 || Barría (1–0) || Coulombe (1–1) || — || 23,158 || 49–49 || W2
|- style="background:#bfb;"
| 99 || July 26 || Rockies || 6–2 || Ohtani (5–1) || Márquez (8–8) || — || 22,751 || 50–49 || W3
|- style="background:#fbb;"
| 100 || July 27 || Rockies || 3–12 || Gomber (8–5) || Suárez (4–4) || — || 16,115 || 50–50 || L1
|- style="background:#bfb;"
| 101 || July 28 || Rockies || 8–7 || Iglesias (7–4) || Estévez (2–3) || — || 16,365 || 51–50 || W1
|- style="background:#fbb;"
| 102 || July 29 || Athletics || 0–4 || Montas (9–8) || Bundy (1–8) || — || 18,631 || 51–51 || L1
|- style="background:#fbb;"
| 103 || July 30 || Athletics || 0–2 || Bassitt (11–3) || Sandoval (3–5) || Trivino (17) || 28,861 || 51–52 || L2
|- style="background:#bfb;"
| 104 || July 31 || Athletics || 1–0 || Barría (2–0) || Irvin (7–10) || Iglesias (22) || 23,207 || 52–52 || W1
|-

|- style="background:#fbb;"
| 105 || August 1 || Athletics || 3–8 || Jefferies (1–0) || Detmers (0–1) || — || 21,597 || 52–53 || L1
|- style="background:#fbb;" 
| 106 || August 2 || @ Rangers || 1–4 || Dunning (5–7) || Rodriguez (2–1) || Patton (1) || 20,533 || 52–54 || L2
|- style="background:#bfb;"
| 107 || August 3 || @ Rangers || 11–3 || Suárez (5–4) || Lyles (5–8) || — || 19,074 || 53–54 || W1
|- style="background:#bfb;"
| 108 || August 4 || @ Rangers || 2–1 || Ohtani (6–1) || Allard (2–10) || Iglesias (23) || 27,360 || 54–54 || W2
|- style="background:#bfb;" 
| 109 || August 5 || @ Rangers || 5–0 || Bundy (2–8) || Howard (0–3) || — || 21,670 || 55–54 || W3
|- style="background:#bfb;"
| 110 || August 6 || @ Dodgers || 4–3  || Warren (1–0) || Cleavinger (2–4) || Iglesias (24) || 50,822 || 56–54 || W4
|- style="background:#fbb;" 
| 111 || August 7 || @ Dodgers || 3–5 || Graterol (2–0) || Guerra (2–2) || Jansen (23) || 50,808 || 56–55 || L1
|- style="background:#fbb;"
| 112 || August 8 || @ Dodgers || 2–8 || Buehler (12–2) || Detmers (0–2) || — || 46,982 || 56–56 || L2
|- style="background:#bfb;"
| 113 || August 10  || @ Blue Jays || 6–3  || Guerra (3–2) || Matz (9–7) || Iglesias (25) || 3,656 || 57–56 || W1
|- style="background:#fbb;"
| 114 || August 10  || Blue Jays || 0–4  || Richards (5–1) || Suárez (5–5) || — || 14,443 || 57–57 || L1
|- style="background:#fbb;"
| 115 || August 11 || Blue Jays || 2–10 || Manoah (5–1) || Bundy (2–9) || — || 22,620 || 57–58 || L2
|- style="background:#bfb;"
| 116 || August 12 || Blue Jays || 6–3 || Ohtani (7–1) || Berríos (8–6) || — || 19,590 || 58–58 || W1
|- style="background:#fbb;"
| 117 || August 13 || Astros || 1–4 || Greinke (11–3) || Sandoval (3–6) || Pressly (19) || 23,981 || 58–59 || L1
|- style="background:#fbb;" 
| 118 || August 14 || Astros || 2–8 || García (9–6) || Barría (2–1) || — || 27,121 || 58–60 || L2
|- style="background:#bfb;"
| 119 || August 15 || Astros || 3–1 || Detmers (1–2) || McCullers Jr. (9–4) || Iglesias (26) || 19,281 || 59–60 || W1 
|- style="background:#fbb;" 
| 120 || August 16 || @ Yankees || 1–2 || Cole (11–6) || Suárez (5–6) || Green (4) || 37,010 || 59–61 || L1
|- style="background:#bfb;" 
| 121 || August 17 || @ Tigers || 8–2 || Mayers (3–4) || Soto (4–3) || — || 24,714 || 60–61 || W1
|- style="background:#bfb;"
| 122 || August 18 || @ Tigers || 3–1 || Ohtani (8–1) || Skubal (8–11) || Iglesias (27) || 27,284 || 61–61 || W2
|- style="background:#bfb;" 
| 123 || August 19 || @ Tigers || 13–10 || Mayers (4–4) || Fulmer (5–5) || Warren (1) || 20,847 || 62–61 || W3
|- style="background:#fbb;" 
| 124 || August 20 || @ Indians || 1–9 || Stephan (2–0) || Barría (2–2) || — || 22,755 || 62–62 || L1
|- style="background:#fbb;"
| 125 || August 21 || @ Indians || 1–5 || McKenzie (3–5) || Detmers (1–3) || — || 31,406 || 62–63 || L2
|- style="background:#fbb;"
| 126 || August 22 || @ Indians || 0–3 || Quantrill (4–2) || Suárez (5–7) || Clase (18) || 1,832 || 62–64 || L3
|- style="background:#bfb;"
| 127 || August 24 || @ Orioles || 14–8 || Guerra (1–0) || Watkins (2–6) || — || 8,781 || 63–64 || W1
|- style="background:#fbb;" 
| 128 || August 25 || @ Orioles || 6–10 || Scott (5–4) || Petricka (0–1) || — || 15,867 || 63–65 || L1
|- style="background:#fbb;" 
| 129 || August 26 || @ Orioles || 1–13 || Akin (1–8) || Peguero (0–1) || — || 10,211 || 63–66 || L2
|- style="background:#fbb;"
| 130 || August 27 || Padres || 0–5 || Musgrove (9–8) || Criswell (0–1) || — || 25,376 || 63–67 || L3
|- style="background:#bfb;"
| 131 || August 28 || Padres || 10–2 || Wantz (1–0) || Weathers (4–7) || — || 36,176 || 64–67 || W1
|- style="background:#bfb;"
| 132 || August 30 || Yankees || 8–7 || Guerra (5–2) || Peralta (4–3) || Iglesias (28) || 29,436 || 65–67 || W2
|- style="background:#bfb;"
| 133 || August 31 || Yankees || 6–4 || Herget (1–1) || Taillon (8–5) || Iglesias (29) || 34,813 || 66–67 || W3
|-

|- style="background:#fbb;" 
| 134 || September 1 || Yankees || 1–4 || Cole (14–6) || Naughton (0–1) || Chapman (25) || 28,753 || 66–68 || L1
|- style="background:#bfb;" 
| 135 || September 3 || Rangers || 3–2 || Ohtani (9–1) || Santana (2–4) || Iglesias (30) || 19,074 || 67–68 || W1
|- style="background:#bfb;"
| 136 || September 4 || Rangers || 4–1 || Suárez (6–7) || Allard (3–12) || — || 22,697 || 68–68 || W2
|- style="background:#fbb;" 
| 137 || September 5 || Rangers || 3–7 || Hearn (5–4) || Junk (0–1) || — || 18,492 || 68–69 || L1
|- style="background:#fbb;" 
| 138 || September 6 || Rangers || 0–4 || Alexy (2–0) || Barría (2–3) || — || 16,241 || 68–70 || L2
|- style="background:#bfb;"
| 139 || September 7 || @ Padres || 4–0 || Herget (2–1) || Snell (7–6) || — || 34,405 || 69–70 || W1
|- style="background:#fbb;" 
| 140 || September 8 || @ Padres || 5–8 || Darvish (8–9) || Mayers (4–5) || Melancon (37) || 34,537 || 69–71 || L1
|- style="background:#fbb;" 
| 141 || September 10 || @ Astros || 5–10 || Valdez (10–5) || Ohtani (9–2) || — || 28,740 || 69–72 || L2
|- style="background:#bfb;"
| 142 || September 11 || @ Astros || 4–2 || Suárez (7–7) || García (10–7) || Iglesias (31) || 31,547 || 70–72 || W1
|- style="background:#fbb;" 
| 143 || September 12 || @ Astros || 1–3 || McCullers Jr. (12–4) || Quijada (0–1) || Pressly (24) || 28,763 || 70–73 || L1
|- style="background:#fbb;" 
| 144 || September 14 || @ White Sox || 3–9 || Bummer (3–5) || Naughton (0–2) || — || 21,848 || 70–74 || L2
|- style="background:#bfb;"
| 145 || September 15 || @ White Sox || 3–2 || Mayers (5–5) || Kopech (4–3) || Iglesias (32) || 26,505 || 71–74 || W1
|- style="background:#bfb;" 
| 146 || September 16 || @ White Sox || 9–3 || Cobb (8–3) || López (3–3) || — || 27,098 || 72–74 || W2
|- style="background:#fbb;" 
| 147 || September 17 || Athletics || 4–5 || Irvin (10–13) || Marte (0–1) || Romo (3) || 18,918 || 72–75 || L1
|- style="background:#fbb;"
| 148 || September 18 || Athletics || 1–3 || Kaprielian (8–5) || Suárez (7–8) || Chafin (5) || 27,150 || 72–76 || L2
|- style="background:#fbb;" 
| 149 || September 19 || Athletics || 2–3  || Trivino (6–7) || Iglesias (7–5) || — || 22,456 || 72–77 || L3
|- style="background:#fbb;"
| 150 || September 20 || Astros || 0–10 || Valdez (11–5) || Barría (2–4) || — || 16,070 || 72–78 || L4
|- style="background:#fbb;"
| 151 || September 21 || Astros || 5–10 || Urquidy (8–3) || Naughton (0–3) || — || 18,332 || 72–79 || L5
|- style="background:#fbb;" 
| 152 || September 22 || Astros || 5–9  || García (4–9) || Selman (0–1) || — || 14,863 || 72–80 || L6
|- style="background:#bfb;"
| 153 || September 23 || Astros || 3–2 || Warren (2–0) || McCullers Jr. (12–5) || Iglesias (33) || 19,829 || 73–80 || W1
|- style="background:#fbb;" 
| 154 || September 24 || Mariners || 5–6 || Smith (4–4) || Herget (2–2) || Sewald (11) || 18,551 || 73–81 || L1
|- style="background:#bfb;"
| 155 || September 25 || Mariners || 14–1 || Díaz (1–0) || Anderson (7–10) || — || 30,221 || 74–81 || W1
|- style="background:#fbb;" 
| 156 || September 26 || Mariners || 1–5 || Gonzales (10–5) || Quijada (0–2) || — || 22,057 || 74–82 || L1
|- style="background:#fbb;" 
| 157 || September 28 || @ Rangers || 2–5 || Alexy (3–1) || Naughton (0–4) || Barlow (10) || 20,066 || 74–83 || L2
|- style="background:#bfb;" 
| 158 || September 29 || @ Rangers || 7–2 || Quijada (1–2) || Hearn (6–6) || — || 23,241 || 75–83 || W1
|- style="background:#fbb;" 
| 159 || September 30 || @ Rangers || 6–7 || Patton (2–2) || Herget (2–3) || Barlow (11) || 19,960 || 75–84 || L1
|-

|- style="background:#bfb;" 
| 160 || October 1 || @ Mariners || 2–1 || Suárez (8–8) || Gonzales (10–6) || Iglesias (34) || 44,169 || 76–84 || W1
|- style="background:#fbb;" 
| 161 || October 2 || @ Mariners || 4–6 || Sewald (10–3) || Cishek (0–2) || Steckenrider (14) || 44,414 || 76–85 || L1
|- style="background:#bfb;"
| 162 || October 3 || @ Mariners || 7–3 || Ortega (1–0) || Anderson (7–11) || — || 44,229 || 77–85 || W1
|-

|- style="text-align:center;"
| Legend:       = Win       = Loss       = PostponementBold = Angels team member

Roster

Farm system

All coaches and rosters can be found on each team's website.

See also
Los Angeles Angels
Angel Stadium

References

External links
Los Angeles Angels Official Site
2021 Los Angeles Angels season at Baseball Reference

Los Angeles Angels seasons
Los Angeles Angels
Los Angeles Angels